Ole-Jørgen Nilsen (28 February 1936 – 15 June 2008) was a Norwegian actor who was perhaps best known for playing the role of Hans Fredrik Rosenkrantz in the soap Hotel Cæsar and from a recurring role in the Olsenbanden films.

Career
Nilsen made his debut as a student at Nationaltheatret in 1959 and graduated from the Norwegian National Academy of Theatre in the same year. He has since worked with Trøndelag Teater in 1961-68, Det Norske Teatret in 1968-73, Fjernsynsteatret in 1974-77, and Nationaltheatret since 1977.

At the Trøndelag Teater, he made his debut in 1966 as the narrator of the piece Heat wave by Ted Williams. At Det Norske Teater he took part in translated productions such as Myrfolket, Johann uten land, Montserrat and not least, playing van Gogh in Postmannen fra Arles. With Nationaltheatret he played among others, a jealous Salieri in Amadeus. He also had central roles in Ibsen's The League of Youth and Peer Gynt.

In the 2000s, he has acted in works including The Master Builder (2003), Maria Stuart (2004) and Til Damaskus (2006), all with Nationaltheatret.

Nilsen was head of Nationaltheatret from 1988 to 1989 together with Ellen Horn and Sverre Rødahl. He was part of Skuespillerforeningen in 1978, and its first foreman.

Filmography
2008 Do or Die-08 Short addition to Love Is War
2005 Selected Shorts#2: European Award Winners (Video)
2004 Lies Inc. ...Benefactor
2003 United ...Johansen
2002 De beste går først ...Ragnar (in section Folk flest bor i Kina)
2000 De 7 dødssyndene
2000 Hovmod
1989 Kamilla og tyven II ...Thygesen
1985 Galskap! ....Erik
1984 Men Olsenbanden var ikke død ...toller
1982 Olsenbandens aller siste kupp ....bodyguard
1981 Olsenbanden gir seg aldri! ...Director of TeamFinans
1979 Olsenbanden og Dynamitt-Harry mot nye høyder ...The big Baron
1979 Rallarblod ...Øl-Kalle
1976 Olsenbanden for full musikk ...Sjåføren
1976 Angst Lendl
1975 Faneflukt ...Politibetjent Lind
1974 Bobbys krig ...Klaus
1972 Motforestilling
1972 Olsenbanden tar gull ...Ricco, international swindler
1972 Lukket avdeling ...Paul Paulus
1970 Love Is War ....Espen
1968 Hennes meget kongelige høyhet ...Anderson, livvakt
1961 Hans Nielsen Hauge  ...Sergeant in Fredrikstad

TV roles
2004-06 Hotel Cæsar ...Hans Fredrik Rosenkrantz
2001 Rosmersholm (TV 2001) ...Ulrik Brendel (Fjernsynsteater)
1997 Blind gudinne ...Bjerke (mini-series)
1995 Rett I Lomma ...Hr Fylking (Play broadcast by NRK)
1988 Fleksnes - Blodgiveren '88 ...leges
1985 The Last Place on Earth ...Alfred Eriksen (mini-series)
1978 Blindpassasjer ...Byråkraten (mini-series)
1973 Et Dukkehjem ...Sakfører Krogstad (Fjernsynsteater)
1972 Fleksnes - Blodgiveren ...Doctor

References

 

1936 births
2008 deaths
Norwegian theatre directors
Oslo National Academy of the Arts alumni
Norwegian male stage actors
Norwegian male film actors
Norwegian male television actors